Norsteroids (nor-, L. norma, from "normal" in chemistry, indicating carbon removal) are a structural class of steroids that have had an atom or atoms (typically carbon) removed, biosynthetically or synthetically, from positions of branching off of rings or side chains (e.g., removal of methyl groups), or from within rings of the steroid ring system. For instance, 19-norsteroids (e.g., 19-norprogesterone) constitute an important class of natural and synthetic steroids derived by removal of the methyl group of the natural product progesterone; the equivalent change between testosterone and 19-nortestosterone (nandrolone) is illustrated below.

Examples
Norsteroid examples include: 19-norpregnane (from  pregnane), desogestrel, ethylestrenol, etynodiol diacetate, ethinylestradiol, gestrinone, levonorgestrel, norethisterone (norethindrone), norgestrel, norpregnatriene (from pregnatriene), quinestrol, 19-norprogesterone (from a progesterone), Nomegestrol acetate, 19-nortestosterone (from a testosterone), and norethisterone acetate.

References

External links
 

Steroids